Agkistrodon is a genus of venomous pit vipers commonly known as American moccasins. The genus is endemic to North America, ranging from the Southern United States to northern Costa Rica. Eight species are currently recognized, all of them monotypic and closely related.  Common names include: cottonmouths, copperheads, and cantils.

Name origin

Some varieties of the genus are given the common name "moccasin" or "moccasin snake" in the United States, which is the Algonquian word for "shoe". The origin of this nickname is unknown. The first known use of "moccasin" to refer to a deadly venomous snake was in a 1765 publication. The nickname is used to refer to both cottonmouths and copperheads. According to the Word Detective, this use may be related to their color and appearance or the silence with which they move. Another source for this name may be the Native American word "mokesoji" of unknown origin and meaning.

Description

Members of this genus have a number of features in common. All species have a relatively broad head with short fangs. A loreal scale is present, except in A. piscivorus. Usually, nine large symmetrical platelike scales are on the crown of the head, but in all species, these are often irregularly fragmented or have sutures, especially in A. bilineatus. All have a sharply defined canthus rostralis and a vertically elliptical pupil. Usually eight (6-10) supralabial scales and usually 10-11 (8-13) sublabials are present. The dorsal scales are mostly keeled and at midbody number 21-25 (usually 23), while A. piscivorus has 23-27 (usually 25). The snake has 127-157 ventral scales and 36-71 subcaudals. Of the latter, some may be divided. The anal scale is single. All have a color pattern of 10-20 dark crossbands on a lighter ground color, although sometimes the crossbands are staggered as half bands on either side of the body.

The phylogeny of the species has long been controversial. Studies based on morphological and venom characteristics support the idea that A. bilineatus and A. contortrix are more closely related. However, an analysis of mitochondrial DNA, as well as more recent molecular studies, have concluded that A. bilineatus and A. piscivorus are sister taxa, with A. contortrix being a sister species to them both.

Geographic range

They are found in North America from the northeastern and central United States southward through peninsular Florida and southwestern Texas, and in Central America on the Atlantic versant from Tamaulipas and Nuevo León southward to the Yucatan Peninsula, Belize, and Guatemala. They are seen along the Pacific coastal plain and lower foothills from Sonora south through Guatemala, El Salvador, Honduras, and Nicaragua to northwestern Costa Rica.

Behavior
All are semiaquatic to terrestrial and are often found near sources of water. However, A. contortrix and A. bilineatus are also found in dry habitats, often far from permanent streams or ponds.

Reproduction
The members of this genus are all ovoviviparous.

A 2012 study found that they are not only capable of parthenogenesis (asexual reproduction), but that litters created without a male may account for up to 5% of litters in the wild, even in areas that have males present. This phenomenon had previously only been observed in captive populations.

Venom
Pit vipers of the genus Agkistrodon rely on a potent venom they produce for their survival. Used to immobilize prey and fend off predators, one bite can inject enough venom into a human to cause severe pain, swelling, weakness, difficulty breathing, hemorrhaging, gangrene, fever, vomiting, and in rare instances, even death.

The venom of all three species is assumed to be not unlike that of A. contortrix, which contains thrombin-like enzymes that act upon the coagulant activity of the blood. A study of electrophoretic patterns of proteins in venoms among and within populations of A. contortrix and A. piscivorus showed that substantial variation exists, and no reason exists to believe that these differences do not correspond with variations in toxicity.

Research
In a study conducted at the College of Medicine at the University of Florida, venom from A. piscivorous was injected into the lymph fluid of a frog. The frog immediately suffocated because of the collapse of its lung sacs. The venom even resulted in lung constriction when directly applied to the surface of the frog's lungs. To test this, trace amounts of venom were dropped onto a single pulmonary sac in a frog's lung after it was anesthetized and its chest cavity dissected open. A drop of solution containing a venom concentration of 1 mg/ml was enough to cause contraction of the pulmonary artery adventitia after 5-8 sec in a frog weighing 40 g. The study found, however, that this toxic effect is simply a tool the snake can choose to employ from an accessory venom gland it has. In most instances, the viper injects a venom that tends to immobilize, not kill, its prey before ingestion. In this case, the main venom glands secrete a toxin that inhibits the prey's sympathetic response to flee or fend off its predator. This essentially stuns the animal so that the predator can easily attack.

Species

T Type species.

Taxonomy
This genus was previously much larger and also included the following genera:

 Calloselasma - Ground pit viper found in Southeast Asia (Malaya).
 Deinagkistrodon - The Hundred-pace viper found mostly in southern China.
 Gloydius - Ground pit vipers found in Asia.
 Hypnale - Hump-nosed vipers found in India and Sri Lanka.

References

Further reading

Daudin FM (1801-1803). Histoire naturelle, générale et particulière des reptiles: ouvrage faisant suit à l'histoire naturelle générale et particulière, composée par Leclerc de Buffon; et rédigée par C.S. Sonnini, miembre de plusieurs sociétés savantes. 8 vols. Paris: F. Dufart. (in French). [For a discussion of the publication date, see Harper F (1940). American Midland Nataturalist 23: 693].
Fischer JG (1813). Zoognosia tabulis synopticus illustrata, in usum praelectionum Academiae Imperialis medico-chirurgicae Mosquensis edita. 3d ed. vol. 1, pt. 3 (Reptiles, Poissons): 57–117. Moscow: Nicolai Sergeidis Vsevolozsky. (in Latin).
Fitzinger LJ (1826). Neue Classification der Reptilien nach ihren natürlichen Verwandtschaften: nebst einer Verwandtschafts-Tafel und einem Verzeichnisse der Reptilien-Sammlung des K. K. Zoologischen Museums zu Wien. Vienna: J.G. Heubner. five unnumbered + 67 pp. + one plate. (in German and Latin).
Hubbs B, O'Connor B (2012). A Guide to the Rattlesnakes and other Venomous Serpents of the United States. Tempe, Arizona: Tricolor Books. 129 pp. .
Link HF (1807). Beschreibung der naturalien-sammlung der Universität zu Rostock. Zweite abtheilung, pp. 51–100. Rostock: Gebruckt bei Adlers Erben. (in German).

Sonnini CS, Latreille PA (1801). Histoire naturelle des reptiles, avec figures dissinees dápres nature. 4 Vols. Paris: Deterville. (in French). [For a discussion of the publication date, see Harper F (1940). American Midland Naturalist 23: 692-723].

Wagler JG (1830). Natürliches System der Amphibien, mit vorangehender Classification der Säugthiere und Vögel. Ein Beitrag zur vergleichenden Zoologie. Munich, Stuttgart and Tübingen: J.G. Cotta. vi + 354 pp. + one plate. (in German and Latin).

External links

 

 
Snake genera
Taxa named by Palisot de Beauvois